The 1836 United States presidential election in Michigan took place between November 3 and December 7, 1836, as part of the 1836 United States presidential election. Voters chose three representatives, or electors to the Electoral College, who voted for President and Vice President.

Michigan voted for the Democratic candidate, Martin Van Buren, over Whig candidate William Henry Harrison in the states first presidential election. Van Buren won the state by a margin of 12.44%.

A dispute similar to that of Indiana in 1817 and Missouri in 1821 arose during the counting of the electoral votes. Michigan only became a state on January 26, 1837, and had cast its electoral votes for president before that date. Anticipating a challenge to the results, Congress resolved on February 4, 1837, that during the counting four days later the final tally would be read twice, once with Michigan and once without Michigan. The counting proceeded in accordance with the resolution. The dispute had no bearing on the final result: either way Van Buren was elected, and either way no candidate had a majority for vice-president.

Results

See also
 United States presidential elections in Michigan

References

Michigan
1836
1836 Michigan elections